Jamais is a French single recorded by U. S. entertainer Connie Francis. The song is a French reworking of Sebastián Yradier's classic tale about a white dove, La Paloma, a song which Francis also recorded in
English (as Your Love)
Italian (as La Paloma)
Neapolitan (as La Paloma)
Portuguese (as La Paloma)
Spanish (as La Paloma, sometimes also credited as Tú Amor)

The B-side of Jamais was Lily Marlène, a French cover version of Lale Andersen's wartime classic Lili Marleen.

Jamais became a Top Ten Single for Francis in Canada and France.

References

1961 singles
Connie Francis songs
Year of song unknown
MGM Records singles